Teuva is a municipality of Finland.

It is located in the South Ostrobothnia region.

The municipality is unilingually Finnish.

History 
In August 2010, more than fifty pocket-sized saunas were gathered on a lakeside within Teuva for the fifth annual Mobile Sauna Festival. Some six-thousand visitors attended the festival, doubling the population of Teuva for the weekend.

Villages
 Horo
 Horonkylä
 Kauppila
 Kirkonkylä
 Komsi
 Korvenkylä
 Luovankylä
 Nori
 Perälä
 Piikkilänkylä
 Riippi
 Salonpää
 Äystö

Notable individuals
Antti Rajamäki, sprinter
Aulis Ranta-Muotio, politician
Elonkerjuu, rock band
Helge Saarikoski, politician and Member of Parliament
Jorma Mattinen, professor and rector at the Åbo Akademi University from 2005-2014
Jukka Rauhala, Olympic wrestler
Lauri Ingman, theologian, bishop, politician and twice Prime Minister of Finland 
Mirjam Tuokkola, archer
Nicole, a band
Oiva Ketonen, philosopher, writer, academic and professor
Otto Syreeni, businessman
Pauli Nevala, javelin thrower
Severi Savonen, professor
Simo Korpela, poet and priest
Roppal, also known as Riskipiiku, professional Osu! player

References

External links

Municipality of Teuva – Official website

Municipalities of South Ostrobothnia
Populated places established in 1868